Kenneth A. Minihan (born December 31, 1943) is a former United States Air Force lieutenant general who served as the director of the National Security Agency and the Defense Intelligence Agency, retiring on May 1, 1999.

Career
Minihan was born in Pampa, Texas. He entered the United States Air Force in 1966 as a distinguished graduate of the Reserve Officer Training Corps program at Florida State University, where he was also a member of Phi Kappa Psi. He served as senior intelligence officer for the air force and in other senior staff officer positions in The Pentagon; Headquarters Tactical Air Command, Langley Air Force Base, Virginia; Electronic Security Command, Kelly Air Force Base, Texas; the Defense Intelligence Agency, Washington, D.C.; and the National Security Agency, Fort George G. Meade, Maryland. He has commanded squadrons, groups and a major air command, both in the United States and overseas. He has been the assistant chief of staff, intelligence, Headquarters United States Air Force, Washington, D.C., and director of the Defense Intelligence Agency.

Personal life
After retiring from the United States Air Force, Minihan served as the president of the Security Affairs Support Association from 1999 until 2002.  He currently serves as a Managing Director in the Paladin Capital Group.

Education
1966 Bachelor of Arts degree in political science, Florida State University, Tallahassee
1972 Squadron Officer School, Maxwell Air Force Base, Alabama
1979 Distinguished graduate, Master of Arts degree in national security affairs, Naval Postgraduate School, Monterey, California
1979 Air Command and Staff College, Maxwell Air Force Base, Alabama
1984 Distinguished graduate, Air War College, Maxwell Air Force Base, Alabama
1993 Program for Senior Executives in National and International Security, Harvard University, Massachusetts

Assignments
September 1962 – June 1966, Air Force Reserve Officer Training Corps program, Florida State University, Tallahassee
June 1966 – November 1966, student, Armed Forces Intelligence Center, Lowry Air Force Base, Colorado
November 1966 – October 1969, intelligence plans officer, Headquarters Tactical Air Command, Langley Air Force Base, Virginia
October 1969 – November 1970, target intelligence officer and commander's briefer, Headquarters 7th Air Force, Tan Son Nhut Air Base, South Vietnam
November 1970 – September 1974, chief, current intelligence and presentations branch, Headquarters U.S. Southern Command, Howard Air Force Base, Panama
September 1974 – July 1978, program element monitor, assistant executive; assistant chief of staff, intelligence; and special assistant for external affairs, Headquarters U.S. Air Force, Washington, D.C.
July 1978 – December 1979, student, Naval Postgraduate School, Monterey, California
January 1980 – September 1981, legislative liaison officer, Defense Intelligence Agency, Washington, D.C.
September 1981 – December 1982, chief, Office of Support to Military Operations and Plans, National Security Agency, Fort George G. Meade, Maryland
December 1982 – July 1983, commander, 6941st Electronic Security Squadron, Fort George G. Meade, Maryland
July 1983 – May 1984, student, Air War College, Maxwell Air Force Base, Alabama
May 1984 – July 1985, commander, 12th Tactical Intelligence Squadron, Bergstrom Air Force Base, Texas
July 1985 – July 1987, commander, 6917th Electronic Security Group, San Vito dei Normanni Air Station, Italy
July 1987 – June 1989, deputy chief of staff, plans, Headquarters Electronic Security Command, Kelly Air Force Base, Texas
June 1989 – July 1991, deputy chief of staff, intelligence, Headquarters Tactical Air Command, Langley Air Force Base, Virginia
July 1991 – June 1993, director of plans and requirements, assistant chief of staff, intelligence, Headquarters U.S. Air Force, Washington, D.C.
June 1993 – October 1993, commander, Air Force Intelligence Command and director, Joint Electronic Warfare Center, Kelly Air Force Base, Texas
October 1993 – October 1994, commander, Air Intelligence Agency and director, Joint Command and Control Warfare Center, Kelly Air Force Base, Texas
October 1994 – September 1995, assistant chief of staff, intelligence, Headquarters U.S. Air Force, Washington, D.C.
September 1995 – February 1996, director, Defense Intelligence Agency, Washington, D.C.
February 1996 – April 1999, director, National Security Agency and Central Security Service, Fort George G. Meade, Maryland

Major awards and decorations
  Defense Distinguished Service Medal
  Legion of Merit with two oak leaf clusters
  Bronze Star
  Defense Meritorious Service Medal
  Meritorious Service Medal with three oak leaf clusters
  National Security Medal
  National Intelligence Distinguished Service Medal
  National Defense Service Medal with service star
  Vietnam Service Medal with four service stars
  Republic of Vietnam Gallantry Cross Unit Citation
  Republic of Vietnam Campaign Medal

References

1943 births
Living people
Directors of the National Security Agency
Harvard University alumni
United States Air Force generals
Directors of the Defense Intelligence Agency
Recipients of the Legion of Merit
United States Air Force personnel of the Vietnam War
Florida State University alumni
Naval Postgraduate School alumni
Recipients of the Order of the Sword (United States)
Recipients of the Defense Distinguished Service Medal
Recipients of the National Intelligence Distinguished Service Medal